The 8th Independent Spirit Awards, honoring the best in independent filmmaking for 1992, were announced on March 27, 1993.  It was hosted by Buck Henry and was the first ceremony held under a tent on the beach in Santa Monica.

Nominees and winners

Films that received multiple nominations

Films that won multiple awards

References

External links 
1992 Spirit Awards at IMDb

1992
Independent Spirit Awards